Caladenia pholcoidea subsp. augustensis, commonly known as the Augustus spider orchid, is a plant in the orchid family Orchidaceae and is endemic to the south-west of Western Australia. It is a rare orchid with a single hairy leaf and up to three mostly white flowers with long spreading petals and lateral sepals.

Description
The sepals and petals have long, brown, drooping, thread-like tips. There are four or more rows of pink calli along the centre of the labellum. Flowering occurs from November to early December. This subspecies is similar to subspecies pholcoidea but has shorter lateral sepals and petals, whiter flowers and a slightly earlier flowering period.

Taxonomy and naming
Caladenia pholcoidea was first found to be described in 2001 by Stephen Hopper and Andrew Phillip Brown and the description was published in Nuytsia. At the same time they described two subspecies, including subspecies augustensis. The subspecies name (augustensis) refers to the town of Augusta where the only known population of this subspecies occurs.

Distribution and habitat
The only known population of this orchid occurs near Augusta, growing under dense Melaleuca shrubs in a winter-wet area.

Conservation
Caladenia pholcoidea subsp. augustensis  is classified as "Priority One" by the Department of Parks and Wildlife, Government of Western Australia, which means that it is known from only one or a very few locations which are potentially at risk.

References 

pholcoidea
Endemic orchids of Australia
Orchids of Western Australia
Plants described in 2001
Taxa named by Stephen Hopper
Taxa named by Andrew Phillip Brown